"LUV Dance-Medley" is the twenty seventh single by Dutch girl group Luv', released in 1993 by the labels Ultrapop/Edel Music in Germany, Switzerland and Austria. This remixed version of the 1989 Hit-medley is composed from parts of the group's greatest hits recorded by Luv' members different from the original formation: Marga Scheide, Michelle Gold and Diana van Berlo.

Song history
While the original Luv' members were reunited in the Spring of 1993 and promoting the "Gold" compilation and the Megamix '93 single, Jacques Zwart, who had produced the 1989-1992 line-up, signed a deal with the German label Edel Music to release a new version of the Hit-medley as a Maxi single. With the help from M. Hilver, Zwart remixed this medley and renamed it LUV Dance-Medley to adapt it to the Eurodance sound which dominated the European charts at this time (2 Unlimited, Culture Beat, 2 Brothers on the 4th Floor, Snap!, U96...). Moreover, a song taken from the For You EP, No Cure No Pay, was also rearranged in the Dance style in order to be added to the Maxi single. LUV Dance-Medley was only available in German speaking countries and as an import record in Benelux. 
Despite Zwart's efforts to conform to the Dance music standards and because of the lack of  promotion by Luv', the Medley didn't top the charts. However, the Megamix '93 single recorded by the original trio reached the Dutch Top 40.

Track listings and formats

Maxi CD Single
"LUV Dance-Medley" (Club Edit) — 6:50
Luvely/You're the Greatest Lover/Trojan Horse/Yes I Do/Casanova/U.O.Me
"LUV Dance-Medley"  — 3:28
Luvely/You're the Greatest Lover/Trojan Horse/Yes I Do/Casanova
"No Cure No Pay" (1993 version) — 3:21

 12" Vinyl Single
"LUV Dance-Medley" (Club Edit) — 6:50
Luvely/You're the Greatest Lover/Trojan Horse/Yes I Do/Casanova/U.O.Me
"LUV Dance-Medley"  — 3:28
Luvely/You're the Greatest Lover/Trojan Horse/Yes I Do/Casanova
"No Cure No Pay" (1993 version) — 3:21

External links
LUV Dance-Medley information on the Discogs website

1993 singles
Luv' songs
Dance-pop songs
Songs written by Hans van Hemert
Songs written by Piet Souer
Music medleys